Mitochondrial translational release factor 1-like is a protein that in humans is encoded by the MTRF1L gene.

Mitochondrial DNA encodes 13 proteins that play essential roles in the respiratory chain, while all proteins involved in mitochondrial translation are encoded by nuclear genes that are imported from the cytoplasm. MTRF1L is a nuclear-encoded protein that functions as a releasing factor that recognizes termination codons and releases mitochondrial ribosomes from the synthesized protein (summary by Nozaki et al., 2008 [PubMed 18429816]).[supplied by OMIM].

Model organisms

Model organisms have been used in the study of MTRF1L function. A conditional knockout mouse line, called Mtrf1ltm1a(KOMP)Wtsi was generated as part of the International Knockout Mouse Consortium program — a high-throughput mutagenesis project to generate and distribute animal models of disease to interested scientists — at the Wellcome Trust Sanger Institute. Male and female animals underwent a standardized phenotypic screen to determine the effects of deletion. Twenty six tests were carried out on mutant mice and three significant abnormalities were observed. No homozygous mutant embryos were recorded during gestation and, in a separate study, no homozygous animals were observed at weaning. The remaining tests were carried out on adult heterozygous mutant animals and males displayed an increased circulating free fatty acid level.

References

Further reading 
 

Genes mutated in mice